The title Jewish Question in Poland may refer to:

 Franciszek Bujak,  essay La question Juive en Pologne, 1919, 
 Stanisław Kutrzeba,  essay La question Juive en Pologne, 1919, 
 Gabriel Jean Edmond Séailles, essay  La question juive en Pologne - Enquête, 1916, 

See also: Jewish Question, History of Jews in Poland